Jayne Lawless (born 1974) is an English installation artist from Liverpool.

A 2011 Fine Art Masters graduate of Bath Spa University following a successful post-graduate diploma course at Stass Paraskos' Cyprus College of Art in Lempa (Lemba), Paphos, Jayne has exhibited work in London, Liverpool, Suffolk, Poland and Slovakia often as part of an artist residency.

Four years after graduating from University Campus Suffolk in Ipswich in 2004, she was a shortlisted finalist of the inaugural Liverpool Art Prize in 2008, Liverpool's Capital of Culture year, for her work Tunnel, a collaboration with Polish born New York architect Marta Gazicka.

From a staunch Liverpool Football Club supporting family, her brother is John Lawless of former Liverpool Folk Indie duo Tom and the Lawless.

References

English installation artists
Living people
Artists from Liverpool
Alumni of the University of Suffolk
Alumni of Bath Spa University
1974 births